The 2006 FIFA World Cup, also branded as Germany 2006, was the 18th FIFA World Cup, the quadrennial international football world championship tournament. It was held from 9 June to 9 July 2006 in Germany, which had won the right to host the event in July 2000. Teams representing 198 national football associations from all six populated continents participated in the qualification process which began in September 2003. Thirty-one teams qualified from this process along with hosts Germany for the finals tournament. It was the second time that Germany staged the competition and the first as a unified country along with the former East Germany with Leipzig as a host city (the other was in 1974 in West Germany), and the 10th time that the tournament was held in Europe.

Italy won the tournament, claiming their fourth World Cup title, defeating France 5–3 in a penalty shoot-out in the final after extra time had finished in a 1–1 draw. Germany defeated Portugal 3–1 to finish in third place. Angola, Ghana, the Ivory Coast, Trinidad and Tobago and Togo made their first appearances in the finals. It was also the only appearance of Serbia and Montenegro under that name; they had previously appeared in 1998 as Yugoslavia. In late May 2006, immediately prior to the tournament, Montenegro voted in a referendum to become an independent nation and dissolve the loose confederacy then existing between it and Serbia; Serbia recognised the results of the referendum in early June. Due to time constraints, FIFA had Serbia and Montenegro play in the World Cup tournament as one team, marking the first instance of multiple sovereign nations competing as one team in a major football tournament since UEFA Euro 1992.

The 2006 World Cup stands as one of the most watched events in television history, garnering an estimated 26.29 billion times viewed compiled over the course of the tournament. The final attracted an estimated audience of 715.1 million people.

Host selection

The vote to choose the hosts of the 2006 tournament was held in July 2000 in Zürich, Switzerland. It involved four bidding nations after Brazil had withdrawn three days earlier: Germany, South Africa, England and Morocco. Three rounds of voting were required, each round eliminating the nation with the fewest votes. The first two rounds were held on 6 July 2000, and the final round was held on 7 July 2000, which Germany won over South Africa.

Bribery and corruption allegations
Accusations of bribery and corruption had marred the success of Germany's bid from the very beginning. On the very day of the vote, a hoax bribery affair was made public, leading to calls for a re-vote. On the night before the vote, German satirical magazine Titanic sent letters to FIFA representatives, offering joke gifts like cuckoo clocks and Black Forest ham in exchange for their vote for Germany. Oceania delegate Charlie Dempsey, who had initially backed England, had then been instructed to support South Africa following England's elimination. He abstained, citing "intolerable pressure" on the eve of the vote. Had Dempsey voted as originally instructed, the vote would have resulted with a 12–12 tie, and FIFA president Sepp Blatter, who favoured the South African bid, would have had to cast the deciding vote.

More irregularities surfaced soon after, including, in the months leading up to the decision, the sudden interest of German politicians and major businesses in the four Asian countries whose delegates were decisive for the vote. Just a week before the vote, the German government under Chancellor Gerhard Schröder lifted their arms embargo on Saudi Arabia and agreed to send grenade launchers to the country. DaimlerChrysler invested several hundred million euros in Hyundai, where one of the sons of the company's founder was a member of FIFA's executive committee. Both Volkswagen and Bayer announced investments in Thailand and South Korea, whose respective delegates Worawi Makudi and Chung Mong-joon were possible voters for Germany. Makudi additionally received a payment by a company of German media mogul Leo Kirch, who also paid millions for usually worthless TV rights for friendly matches of the Germany team and FC Bayern Munich.

On 16 October 2015, German news magazine Der Spiegel alleged that a slush fund with money from then-Adidas CEO Robert Louis-Dreyfus was used to influence the vote of four Asian members of the FIFA executive committee. The sum of €6.7 million was later demanded back by Dreyfus. In order to retrieve the money, the Organising Committee paid an equivalent sum to the FIFA, allegedly as a German share for the cost of a closing ceremony, which never materialized. Wolfgang Niersbach, president of the German Football Association (DFB), denied the allegations on 17 October 2015, saying that "the World Cup was not bought" and that he could "absolutely and categorically rule out the existence of a slush fund". The DFB announced they would consider seeking legal action against Der Spiegel. During a press conference on 22 October 2015, Niersbach repeated his stance, emphasising that the €6.7 million was used in 2002 to secure a subsidy by FIFA. According to Niersbach, the payment had been agreed upon during a meeting between Franz Beckenbauer and FIFA president Blatter, with the money being provided by Dreyfus. On the same day, FIFA contradicted Niersbach's statement, saying: "By our current state of knowledge, no such payment of 10 million francs was registered by FIFA in 2002." The following day, former DFB president Theo Zwanziger publicly accused Niersbach of lying, saying: "It is evident that there was a slush fund for the German World Cup application". According to Zwanziger, the €6.7 million went to Mohamed Bin Hammam, who at the time was supporting Blatter's campaign for president against Issa Hayatou.

On 22 March 2016 it was announced that the FIFA Ethics Committee was opening proceedings into the bid.

Qualification

198 teams attempted to qualify for the 2006 World Cup. Germany, the host nation, was granted automatic qualification, with the remaining 31 finals places divided among the continental confederations. Thirteen places were contested by UEFA teams (Europe), five by CAF teams (Africa), four by CONMEBOL teams (South America), four by AFC teams (Asia), and three by CONCACAF teams (North and Central America and Caribbean). The remaining two places were decided by playoffs between AFC and CONCACAF and between CONMEBOL and OFC (Oceania).

Eight nations qualified for the finals for the first time: Angola, Czech Republic, Ghana, Ivory Coast, Togo, Trinidad and Tobago, Ukraine, and Serbia and Montenegro. Czech Republic and Ukraine were making their first appearance as independent nations, but had previously been represented as part of Czechoslovakia and the Soviet Union respectively; Serbia and Montenegro had competed as Federal Republic of Yugoslavia in 1998, as well as making up part of Yugoslav teams from 1930 to 1990. As of 2022, this was the last time Togo, Angola, Czech Republic, Ukraine and Trinidad and Tobago qualified for a FIFA World Cup finals, and the last time Uruguay failed to qualify.

Australia qualified for the first time since 1974. Among the teams who failed to qualify were 2002 third-placed team Turkey, quarter-finalists Senegal, Euro 2004 winners Greece and 2006 Africa Cup of Nations winners Egypt. Additionally, Belgium failed to qualify for the first time since 1978 and Cameroon failed to qualify for the first time since 1986. The other notable qualifying streaks broken were for Nigeria, who had made the previous three tournaments, and Denmark and South Africa, who had both qualified for the previous two. France had their first successful qualifying campaign since 1986, as they did not qualify for the 1990 and 1994 World Cups, in 1998 they were automatically qualified as hosts and in 2002 as defending champions.

For the first time since the 1982 World Cup, all six confederations were represented at the finals tournament.

The State Union of Serbia and Montenegro dissolved prior to the start of the World Cup, on 3 June 2006, with Serbia and Montenegro becoming independent countries; their team competed at the World Cup unaffected. Their involvement in the competition became similar to the Commonwealth of Independent States that appeared at UEFA Euro 1992, a team formed to take the Soviet Union's place following dissolution, that multiple sovereign states had been represented in the finals of a major footballing tournament by a single team and the only occurrence in the World Cup finals to date. The highest ranked team not to qualify was Denmark (ranked 11th), while the lowest ranked team that did qualify was Togo (ranked 61st).

List of qualified teams
The following 32 teams, shown with final pre-tournament rankings, qualified for the finals tournament:

AFC (4)
 
 
 
 
CAF (5)
 
 
 
 
 

CONCACAF (4)
 
 
 
 
CONMEBOL (4)
 
 
 
 
OFC (1)
 

UEFA (14)

Venues
In 2006, Germany had a plethora of football stadia that satisfied FIFA's minimum capacity of 40,000 seats for World Cup matches. The outdated and still-standing Olympiastadion in Munich (69,250), the venue for the 1974 final match was not used for the tournament, even though FIFA's regulations allow one city to use two stadia. Düsseldorf's LTU Arena (51,500), Bremen's Weserstadion (43,000) and Mönchengladbach's Borussia-Park (46,249) were also not used.

Twelve stadia were selected to host the World Cup matches. During the tournament, many of them were known by different names, as FIFA prohibits sponsorship of stadia unless the stadium sponsors are also official FIFA sponsors. For example, the Allianz Arena in Munich was known during the competition as FIFA World Cup Stadium, Munich, and even the letters of the company Allianz were removed or covered. Some of the stadia also had a lower capacity for the World Cup, as FIFA regulations ban standing room; nonetheless, this was accommodated as several stadia had a UEFA five-star ranking. The stadia in Berlin, Munich, Dortmund and Stuttgart hosted six matches each, while the other eight stadia hosted five matches each.

A cross denotes an indoor stadium.

Team base camps
Base camps were used by the 32 national squads to stay and train before and during the World Cup tournament. FIFA announced the base camps for each participating team.

{| class="wikitable collapsible collapsed"
|-
! colspan="2"| National squads' base camps
|-

|}

Match officials

Squads

Squads for the 2006 World Cup consisted of 23 players, as in the previous tournament in 2002. Each participating national association had to confirm its 23-player squad by 15 May 2006.

Groups

Seeds

The eight seeded teams for the tournament were announced on 6 December 2005 and placed into Pot A for the draw. Pot B contained the unseeded qualifiers from South America, Africa and Oceania; Pot C contained eight of the nine remaining European teams, excluding Serbia and Montenegro. Pot D contained unseeded teams from the CONCACAF region and Asia. To ensure that no group contained three European teams, Serbia and Montenegro was placed in a special pot, as they were the lowest ranked qualified team from Europe on the latest FIFA World Ranking; while it was deemed of less importance they had been seeded higher than Switzerland and Ukraine by the 2006 World Cup seeding tool. Serbia and Montenegro was drawn first, then their group was drawn from the three seeded non-European nations, Argentina, Brazil, and Mexico.

FIFA predetermined that, hosts, Germany would be placed in Group A, thus being assured of the venues of their group matches in advance of the draw. They also announced, in advance, that Brazil (the defending champion) would be allocated to Group F.

The group stage draw was held in Leipzig on 9 December 2005, and the group assignments and order of matches were determined. After the draw was completed, commentators remarked that Group C appeared to be the group of death, while others suggested Group E. Argentina and the Netherlands both qualified with a game to spare with wins over Ivory Coast and Serbia and Montenegro respectively.

Group system
The first round, or group stage, saw the thirty-two teams divided into eight groups of four teams. Each group was a round-robin of three games, where each team played one match against each of the other teams in the same group. Teams were awarded three points for a win, one point for a draw and none for a defeat. The teams coming first and second in each group qualified for the Round of 16.

Ranking criteria
If teams were level on points, they were ranked on the following criteria in order:

In the original version of the rules for the finals tournament, the ranking criteria were in a different order, with head-to-head results taking precedence over total goal difference. The rules were changed to the above in advance of the tournament, but older versions were still available on the FIFA and UEFA websites, causing some confusion among those trying to identify the correct criteria.
In any event, the finals tournament saw only two pairs of teams level on points: Argentina and the Netherlands at 7 points in Group C; Tunisia and Saudi Arabia at 1 point in Group H. Both of these ties were resolved on total goal difference. Also, in both cases the teams had tied their match, so the order of ranking criteria made no difference.

Finals tournament

The finals tournament of the 2006 World Cup began on 9 June. The 32 teams were divided into eight groups of four teams each, within which the teams competed in a round-robin tournament to determine which two of those four teams would advance to the sixteen-team knock-out stage, which started on 24 June. In total, 64 games were played.

Hosting
Although Germany failed to win the Cup, the tournament was considered a great success for Germany in general. Germany also experienced a sudden increase in patriotic spirit with flags waving, traditionally frowned upon by German society since World War II whenever the German team played. For the closing ceremonies, Matthias Keller composed a work performed simultaneously by the Munich Philharmonic Orchestra, the Bavarian State Orchestra and the Bavarian Radio Orchestra with conductors Christian Thielemann, Zubin Mehta and Mariss Jansons, and soloists Diana Damrau, Plácido Domingo and Lang Lang.

Traditional powers dominate
Despite early success by Australia, Ecuador and Ghana, the tournament marked a return to dominance of traditional football powers. Four years after the 2002 tournament, in which teams from North America (the United States), Africa (Senegal) and Asia (South Korea) made it deep into the knockout stages and Turkey finished third, all eight seeded teams progressed to the knockout stages and none of the quarter-finalists were from outside Europe or South America. Six former champions took part in the quarter-finals, with Ukraine and Euro 2004 runners-up Portugal as the only relative outsiders. Argentina and Brazil were eliminated in the quarter-finals, leaving an all-European final four for only the fourth time (after the 1934, 1966 and 1982 tournaments).

Scoring
Despite the early goals that flooded the group stages, the knock-out phase had a much lower goals per match ratio. A prime example of the dearth of goals was Portugal, which only scored in the 23rd minute of the round of 16, and did not score again until the 88th minute of the third place play-off. No player managed to score a hat-trick in this tournament. Italy, Germany, Argentina, Brazil and France were the only teams to score more than one goal in a knockout match. Germany was one of the exceptions, tending to play an attacking style of football throughout the knock-out stage, which was reflected by the fact that they scored the most goals (14), with players from all three outfield positions (defence, midfield and forward) making the scoresheet.

Germany's Miroslav Klose scored five goals to claim the Golden Boot, the lowest total to win the prize since 1962. No other player scored more than three goals. No player from the winning Italian squad scored more than two goals, though ten players had scored for the team, tying France's record in 1982 for the most goalscorers from any one team.

For the first time ever in the FIFA World Cup, the first and last goals of the tournament were scored by defenders. German left-back Philipp Lahm scored the opener against Costa Rica after only 5 minutes of the opening match. In the final, Italian centre-back Marco Materazzi out-jumped Patrick Vieira and headed in the last goal of the 2006 World Cup. In addition, Fabio Grosso clinched the cup for Italy with the decisive spot kick in the penalty shootout.

Unprecedented number of cards
The tournament had a record number of yellow and red cards, breaking the previous record set by the 1998 World Cup. Players received a record-breaking 345 yellow cards and 28 red cards, with Russian referee Valentin Ivanov handing out 16 yellow and 4 red cards in the round of 16 match between Portugal and the Netherlands in a match known as the Battle of Nuremberg. Portugal had two players suspended for each of the quarter-final and semi-final matches respectively. FIFA President Sepp Blatter hinted that he may allow some rule changes for future tournaments so that earlier accumulated bookings will not force players to miss the final, should their teams make it that far. The tournament also saw English referee Graham Poll mistakenly hand out three yellow cards to Croatia's Josip Šimunić in their match against Australia.

The high number of yellow and red cards shown also prompted discussion about the tournament's referees. FIFA officials and President Sepp Blatter received criticism for allegedly making rules too rigid and taking discretion away from referees.

Group stage
 

All times are Central European Summer Time (UTC+2).

In the following tables:
 Pld = total games played
 W = total games won
 D = total games drawn (tied)
 L = total games lost
 GF = total goals scored (goals for)
 GA = total goals conceded (goals against)
 GD = goal difference (GF−GA)
 Pts = total points accumulated

Group A

In the opening match of the tournament, Germany and Costa Rica played a game which ended 4–2 for the host in the highest scoring opening match in the tournament's history. Germany went on to win the Group A after edging Poland and breezing past Ecuador 3–0. Despite the defeat, Ecuador had already joined the host in the Round of 16 having beaten Poland and Costa Rica 2–0 and 3–0, respectively.

Group B

In Group B, England and Sweden pushed Paraguay into third place after narrow victories over the South Americans. Trinidad and Tobago earned some international respect after a draw with Sweden in their opening game and managing to hold England scoreless for 83 minutes, until goals from Peter Crouch and Steven Gerrard sealed a 2–0 win for the Three Lions. Sweden qualified for the knockout rounds after drawing 2–2 with England to maintain their 38-year unbeaten record against them.

Group C

Both Argentina and Netherlands qualified from Group C with a game remaining. Argentina topped the group on goal difference, having hammered Serbia and Montenegro 6–0 and beaten Ivory Coast 2–1. The Dutch picked up 1–0 and 2–1 victories over Serbia and Montenegro and Ivory Coast, respectively. Ivory Coast defeated Serbia and Montenegro 3–2 in their final game, in Serbia and Montenegro's last international as the country had dissolved 18 days earlier.

Group D

Portugal coasted through in Group D, picking up the maximum number of points, with Mexico qualifying in second. Iran missed chances against Mexico in their opening 1–3 defeat and were eliminated in their match against Portugal. They fought hard against the Portuguese, but lost 2–0. Their last game against Angola ended in 1–1 draw. The Africans had a respectable first World Cup tournament after earning draws with Mexico (0–0) and Iran.

Group E

In Group E, Italy went through to the Round of 16 conceding just one goal (an own goal) by Cristian Zaccardo in the group phase against the United States. The US bowed out of the tournament after disappointing results against the Czech Republic and Ghana, 0–3 and 1–2, respectively, despite a 1–1 draw (finishing with 9 vs 10 men) against Italy. Tournament debutant Ghana joined Italy in the round of 16, following victories over the Czech Republic and the United States. Daniele De Rossi was suspended for 4 games following his sending-off against the United States.

Group F

Group F included the reigning World Champions Brazil, Croatia, Japan, and Australia. Playing in their first World Cup for 32 years, Australia came from behind to defeat Japan 3–1, and, despite losing 0–2 to Brazil, a 2–2 draw with Croatia was enough to give the Australians a place in the Round of 16 in a game where two players were sent-off for second bookings and one, erroneously, for a third booking by English referee Graham Poll. The Brazilians won all three games to qualify first in the group. Their 1–0 win against Croatia was through a goal late in the first-half by Kaká. Croatia and Japan went out of the tournament without a single win.

Group G

France only managed a scoreless draw against Switzerland and a 1–1 draw against South Korea. With captain Zinedine Zidane suspended, their 2–0 win against Togo was enough for them to advance to the knockout round. They were joined by the group winners, Switzerland, who defeated South Korea 2–0, and did not concede a goal in the tournament. South Korea won their first World Cup finals match outside their own country in defeating Togo, but four points were not enough to see them through to the round of 16 (the only team for which this was the case), while Togo exited without a point.

Group H

Spain dominated Group H, picking up the maximum number of points, scoring 8 goals, and conceding only 1. Ukraine, despite being beaten 4–0 by Spain in their first World Cup game, took advantage of the weaker opponents to beat Saudi Arabia 4–0 and scrape past Tunisia 1–0 thanks to a 70th-minute penalty by Andriy Shevchenko, to reach the Round of 16. Saudi Arabia and Tunisia went out of the tournament having 1 point each, thanks to a 2–2 draw against each other.

Knockout stage

The knockout stage involved the sixteen teams that qualified from the group stage of the tournament. There were four rounds of matches, with each round eliminating half of the teams entering that round. The successive rounds were: round of 16, quarter-finals, semi-finals, and final. There was also a play-off to decide third/fourth place. For each game in the knockout stage, a draw was followed by thirty minutes of extra time (two 15-minute halves); if scores were still level there would be a penalty shoot-out (at least five penalties each, and more if necessary) to determine who progressed to the next round. Scores after extra time are indicated by (aet), and penalty shoot-outs are indicated by (pen.).

Round of 16
In the second round, conceding two early goals in the first twelve minutes to Germany effectively ended the Swedes' hopes of progressing to the quarter-finals. Argentina struggled to get past Mexico until a Maxi Rodríguez goal in extra time put the Albiceleste in the quarter-finals. Australia's journey ended when Italians were awarded a controversial penalty, scored by Francesco Totti, deep into the remaining seconds of the match. The Italians had spent much of the game with only ten men on the field, following an equally controversial red card shown to centre back Marco Materazzi. In a 0–0 match, described in The Guardian as "the dullest game in World Cup history", Switzerland failed to convert any of their three penalties in the penalty shoot-out against Ukraine to see them exit the competition with an unwanted new record in becoming the first team in a World Cup to fail to convert any penalties in a shootout. Their elimination also meant that they became the first nation to be eliminated from the World Cup without conceding any goals (and indeed the only nation ever to participate in a World Cup finals tournament without conceding a goal). No two teams from the same group qualified for the quarters, all eight teams were from different groups.

England struggled against Ecuador but won 1–0 thanks to a David Beckham free kick. Brazil won 3–0 against Ghana, in a game which included Ronaldo's record 15th World Cup goal. Der Spiegel reported that the match may have been influenced by an Asian betting syndicate. Portugal defeated the Netherlands 1–0. The only goal came courtesy of a Maniche strike in an acrimonious match, which marked a new World Cup record with 16 yellow cards (Portugal: 9, the Netherlands: 7) and 4 players being sent off for a second bookable offence. France came from behind to defeat Spain 3–1 thanks to goals from Franck Ribéry, Patrick Vieira, and Zinedine Zidane.

Quarter-finals
Germany and Argentina ended 1–1 after extra time; the hosts edged out the Argentinians 4–2 on penalties to go through to the semifinals (this was the first time Argentina had lost a World Cup penalty shootout: up until this match, Argentina and Germany had each participated in three penalty shootouts, winning all of them).

In Gelsenkirchen, England faced Portugal in a repeat of their Euro 2004 quarter-final. This time Wayne Rooney was sent off, and Portugal again won on penalties, 3–1 after a 0–0 draw to reach their first World Cup semi-final since the days of Eusébio 40 years earlier. This gave manager Luiz Felipe Scolari his third consecutive tournament quarter-final win over Sven-Göran Eriksson's England, first with Brazil en route to their 2002 World Cup win, then with Portugal in 2004 and 2006.

Italy defeated quarter-final debutants Ukraine 3–0. France eliminated Brazil 1–0 to advance into the semi-finals. Brazil only managed one shot on goal, while Zinedine Zidane's dribbling earned him Man of the Match and his free-kick to Thierry Henry resulted in the winning goal.

Semi-finals
With Argentina and Brazil eliminated in the quarter-finals, an all-European semi-final line up was completed for only the fourth time (after the 1934, 1966 and 1982 tournaments).

The semi-final between Germany and Italy produced an extra time period that went scoreless until the 118th minute, when Italy scored twice through Fabio Grosso and Alessandro Del Piero, putting an end to Germany's undefeated record in Dortmund.

In the second semi-final, Portugal lost to France 1–0 in Munich. In a repeat of the Euro 1984 and Euro 2000 semi-finals, Portugal were defeated by France, with the decisive goal being a penalty scored by France captain Zinedine Zidane.

Third place play-off
The hosts got three goals in 20 minutes in the second half with the help of 21-year-old left midfielder Bastian Schweinsteiger. His first goal beat the Portuguese goalkeeper Ricardo with pace over his head. Only 4 minutes later, Schweinsteiger's free kick 30 metres from the left of the penalty box, driven low across goal, was connected with Petit's knee to become an own goal for Portugal. The German did not stop, and netted his second goal, which swerved away to the keeper's left, in the 78th minute.

Portugal were strong in possession but lacked punch in attack; unable to convert 57% possession into goals. Pauleta had two clear chances from 15 metres, but both times hit tame shots that did not trouble keeper Oliver Kahn, who was playing in his last match for the German national team. Portugal got a consolation goal with the help of substitute Luís Figo (also playing the final international game of his career), who almost immediately provided the precise distribution needed to unlock the German defence. A cross from the right wing on 88 minutes found fellow substitute Nuno Gomes at the far post, who dived in for the goal. The game ended 3–1, a result which gave the tournament hosts the bronze medals and left Portugal in fourth place.

Final

The final started with each side scoring within the first 20 minutes. Zinedine Zidane opened the scoring by converting a controversial seventh-minute penalty kick, which glanced off the underside of the crossbar and bounced beyond the goal line before it spun back up, hit the crossbar again and rebounded out of the goal. Marco Materazzi then levelled the scores in the 19th minute following an Andrea Pirlo corner. Both teams had chances to score the winning goal in normal time: Luca Toni hit the crossbar in the 35th minute for Italy (he later had a header disallowed for offside), while France were not awarded a possible second penalty in the 53rd minute when Florent Malouda went down in the box after a tackle from Gianluca Zambrotta.

At the end of the regulation 90 minutes, the score was still level at 1–1, and the match went into extra time. Italian goalkeeper Gianluigi Buffon made a potentially game-saving save in extra time when he tipped a Zidane header over the crossbar. Further controversy ensued near the end of extra time, when Zidane head-butted Materazzi in the chest in an off-the-ball incident and was sent off. Extra time produced no further goals and a penalty shootout followed, which Italy won 5–3. France's David Trezeguet, the man who scored the golden goal against Italy in Euro 2000, was the only player not to score his penalty; his spot kick hit the crossbar, landed on the goal line, and went out. It was the first all-European final since Italy's triumph over West Germany in the 1982 World Cup, and the second final, after 1994, to be decided on penalties. It was also Italy's first world title in 24 years, and their fourth overall, making them the second most successful World Cup team ever. The victory also helped Italy top the FIFA World Rankings in February 2007 for the first time since November 1993.

Statistics

Goalscorers
Miroslav Klose received the Golden Boot for scoring five goals in the World Cup. In total, 147 goals were scored by 110 players, with four of them credited as own goals.

Awards

FIFA's Technical Study Group (TSG) also granted a Man of the Match award to one player in each match. Italy's Andrea Pirlo won the most Man of the Match awards with three in total. Miroslav Klose, Agustín Delgado, Arjen Robben, Zé Roberto, Alexander Frei, Michael Ballack and Patrick Vieira each received two awards.

All-star team
The All-star team is a squad consisting of the 23 most impressive players at the 2006 World Cup, as selected by FIFA's Technical Study Group. The team was chosen from a shortlist of over 50 players, and was selected based on performances from the second round onwards.

Prize money
A total of CHF332 million was awarded to the 32 teams participating in the tournament. Each team who entered the competition received CHF2 million, with the biggest prize being CHF24.5 million, awarded to the winner of the tournament. Below is a complete list of the prize money allocated:

 CHF7 million – To each team eliminated in the group stage (16 teams)
 CHF8.5 million – To each team eliminated in the round of 16 (8 teams)
 CHF11.5 million – To each team eliminated in the quarter-finals (4 teams)
 CHF21.5 million – Fourth placed team and Third placed team
 CHF22.5 million – Runners-up
 CHF24.5 million – Winner

Final standings
All 32 teams are ranked based on criteria which have been used by FIFA. A penalty shoot-out counts as a draw for both teams.

Fan Fests

In preparation for the tournament, FIFA and the Organising Committee sought a way to accommodate people planning to visit. The experience of past World Cups and public viewing was conceptualized in 4-week-long events for football supporters to meet, board, interact, partake in cultural activities and watch all 64 matches on giant video walls. Since 2004, the details on costs, logistics, safety issues, marketing and broadcasting rights were jointly hammered out by FIFA and the host cities. These public viewing events, known as "Fan Fests", served an idea to provide football supporters without tickets a legitimate opportunity to partake in the World Cup. Unlike the past tournaments where ticket-less fans were treated as security risks, the World Cup in Germany welcomed all supporters, thus generating positive atmosphere even before the tournament began. Even though security planners and media were sceptical and cautious on the matter of public viewing, the scepticism was cast aside with the beginning of the World Cup.

Fan Fests for the World Cup were set up in 12 host cities and attracted 21 million visitors over the duration of tournament according to German National Tourist Board (FIFA claimed there were over 18 million visitors). The Berlin Fan Fest was located at the pedestrianised Straße des 17. Juni, between Brandenburg Gate and the Victory Column, with 14 consecutive video walls attracted 9 million fans over the duration of World Cup with nearly a million supporters in each match that Germany played. For the first time in German history, an event scored more visitors than Oktoberfest. The Cologne Fan Fest scored 3 million visitors, followed by 1.9 million in Frankfurt, 1.5 million in Stuttgart, 1.46 million in Hamburg, 1 million in Dortmund and Munich, 500 thousand in Nuremberg and Hannover, 471 thousand in Leipzig, 350 thousand in Gelsenkirchen and 205 thousand in Kaiserslautern. Those numbers exceeded all expectations and some of the Host Cities had to expand the Fan Fest areas in the middle of the World Cup. The most popular Fan Fests were located in the inner city areas, making the approach to keep the city centre generally "fan-free" applied by the authorities of Nuremberg ineffective as many football supporters preferred to stay in the picturesque city centre. According to surveys conducted during the 2006 FIFA World Cup at the Berlin, Frankfurt and Munich Fan Fests, 28% of visitors travelled over 100 kilometres to attend to event and up to 84% came there together with friends. Around 21% of foreigners interviewed at Fan Fests visited Germany to see the World Cup without tickets to any match. Media coverage of events had an additional positive effect as pictures of fans celebrating in front of giant screens attracted even more visitors from neighbouring European countries that spontaneously decided to take part in celebrations at Fan Fests.

Despite minor inconsistencies in planning and execution, the Fan Fest concept was so successful in fact, numerous people later claimed personal responsibility for the invention. The visitors' expectations regarding Fan Fests were fulfilled. During the World Cup, Fan Fests served as modern market squares where communication and interaction strengthen the feeling of community. Out-of-home media reception made the emotional aspect of escape from everyday life more intense for participants. Pictures of football supporters celebrating in front of video walls became a typical illustration of atmosphere in the country, while "Fanmeile" was later picked up as the German Word of the Year. In 2007, FIFA and the 12 host cities received the German Marketing Prize for Sports for the innovative nature and marketing concept of Fan Fests. FIFA and the Host Cities succeeded in creating and comfortable environment for foreign fans as 95% of them surveyed at Fan Fests agreed that it was an unequivocal declaration of international nature of World Cup and not a mere event for Germans. A thought-out implementation of public viewing at such a large-scale football event as the 2006 World Cup became set a precedent. Immediately after the World Cup, FIFA announced that it registered the trademark for Fan Fests, taking over the organisation and marketing and making Fan Fests an integral part of future World Cups.

Locations 
 Berlin — Straße des 17. Juni (between Brandenburg Gate and Victory Column)
 Cologne — , Roncalliplatz, Rheinauhafen and Deutzer shipyard
 Frankfurt —  (at banks of Main river)
 Stuttgart — Schlossplatz
 Hamburg — Heiligengeistfeld
 Dortmund — 
 Munich — Olympiapark
 Nuremberg — Volksfestplatz
 Hannover — 
 Leipzig — Augustusplatz
 Gelsenkirchen — Glückauf-Kampfbahn
 Kaiserslautern — , Barbarossastrasse

Marketing

Sponsorship
The sponsors of the 2006 World Cup consisted of 15 FIFA Partners.

Symbols

Mascot

The official mascot of this World Cup was "Goleo VI"

Match ball

The official match ball was "Teamgeist", manufactured by Adidas.

Music

The official song was "The Time of Our Lives". The official anthem was "Zeit dass sich was dreht (Celebrate The Day)".

Evaluation of Germany as host nation 

FIFA president Sepp Blatter stated the organization of the tournament was the best in history and that Germany had a welcoming public. Through the many fanfests and large-screen broadcasts the feeling of a four-week national festival developed, in which much of the population took part.

During the first weeks of the tournament, there was concerned discussion about the wide display of the German national flag and the German national colours on houses, vehicles and clothing. Numerous national and international observers from media, society and politics considered that this signified not only great support for the German football team, but even a "new patriotism". This continued a development already observed during the 2002 FIFA World Cup. A study by the University of Marburg suggested a slight rise in national pride. However, sporadic attempts of far right organisations to use the tournament as a platform for their propaganda remained unsuccessful.

As the German national football team contributed to arousing this previously undeclared enthusiasm and euphoria in Germany over a period of weeks, the then German President Horst Köhler presented the national players on 14 August 2006 with the Silbernes Lorbeerblatt (Silver Laurel Leaf), the highest sports award in Germany. The team's trainer, Jürgen Klinsmann, in February 2007 was furthermore awarded the Bundesverdienstkreuz, not least for his reformed methods of modern training and playing methods, in which he persevered despite harsh criticism. Nevertheless, Klinsmann announced after the tournament that he would not extend his contract as trainer of the national team, since he felt completely burned-out and wished to spend more time with his family in California. The German Football Association (DFB) on the same day named as Klinsmann's successor his assistant trainer Joachim Löw, since in the opinion of the DFB leadership he would best continue Klinsmann's work and training methods.

According to a representative survey taken in Trier by the European Tourism Institute (ETI), 96% of the German population considered that Germany was a good host during the World Cup. Additionally 93% of those interviewed found the international football fans to be agreeable.

See also

 2006 FIFA World Cup:
 A time to make friends
 Broadcasting rights
 Controversies
 Disciplinary record
 Officials
 Organizing Committee
 Qualification
 Seeding
 Sponsorship
 Squads
 FIFA World Cup records
 Leeuwenhosen controversy
Strangers, a 2007 film which takes place during the 2006 World Cup
Deutschland. Ein Sommermärchen, a 2006 documentary film recording the Germany national team from boot camp in Sardegna to third place play-off against Portugal
 Adidas Teamgeist
 Voices from the FIFA World Cup
 Several countries celebrated this major event with the minting of specially high value commemorative coins. Among them is the Belgian 20 euro Germany 2006 FIFA World Cup Coin. The obverse of the coin shows a footballer with a ball, right above them '2006 FIFA World Cup Germany' can be clearly seen.
 2006 FIFA World Cup Organizing Committee
 2011 FIFA Women's World Cup, also held in Germany

Footnotes

References

External links

2006 FIFA World Cup Germany, FIFA.com
FIFA Technical Report (Part 1) and (Part 2)
RSSSF Archive of finals
Official FIFA World Cup site 
Germany 2006 – Home

 
Football World Cup
World
FIFA World Cup tournaments
International association football competitions hosted by Germany
Corruption in Germany
June 2006 sports events in Europe
July 2006 sports events in Europe